Trechus davanensis is a species of ground beetle in the subfamily Trechinae. It was described by Sciaky & Pavesi in 1994.

References

davanensis
Beetles described in 1994